Elías Cárdenas Márquez (born 2 September 1936) is a Mexican politician from the Citizens' Movement. From 2006 to 2009 he served as Deputy of the LX Legislature of the Mexican Congress representing the State of Mexico, and he previously served in the XLVIII Legislature of the Congress of Coahuila.

References

1936 births
Living people
Politicians from the State of Mexico
Citizens' Movement (Mexico) politicians
20th-century Mexican politicians
21st-century Mexican politicians
Deputies of the LX Legislature of Mexico
Members of the Chamber of Deputies (Mexico) for the State of Mexico
Autonomous University of Coahuila alumni
Members of the Congress of Coahuila